Fruit picking or fruit harvesting is a seasonal activity (paid or recreational) that occurs during harvest time in areas with fruit growing wild or being farmed in orchards. Some farms market "You-Pick" for orchards, such as the tradition of Apple and Orange picking in North America, as a form of value-add agritourism.

Types of fruit

Apple picking

Apple picking is an activity found at apple farms. Apple orchards may be opened to the public, allowing consumers to pick their own apples or purchase pre-picked apples.

Although this is ultimately a method of purchasing apples, it is often a social activity as well. Apple picking is often a very popular dating ritual in the American Midwest. Apple orchards catering to a family outing will provide additional activities beyond the picking of apples. Many have petting zoos, restaurants and country shops that sell related products such as home-made jams and jellies.  This aspect of the activity is especially popular in the Northeastern United States & Southern Ontario and Southern Québec in Canada.

The apples that fall off the trees are often used to make apple cider. Apple cider is a juice made grinding the apples, then pressing out the juice.

Workers

Most fruit picking is done by migrant workers, who can be paid relatively low wages. In California, Mexican migrants most frequently do the work. There has been much controversy about replacing workers with automation.  It puts many out of work.

In Australia and New Zealand, people engaging in backpacker tourism do a lot of the fruit-picking work while on a working holiday visa. The Australian government encourages people on this visa to do this sort of work for a minimum of three months so they can add another year to their visa. This benefit does not apply to all parts of Australia - one must undertake work in selected post-code areas to become eligible for the extra year.

Monoculture orchards can face particular labor-timetable issues.

Automation
As labor costs are still quite expensive in fruit picking, robots are being designed that can replace humans for this kind of work. The research is still in full progress, especially as the robots need to be carefully designed so that they do not bruise the fruit while picking. One solution is the use of suction grippers. Citrus fruit robot pickers have thus far been the focus of research and development, but cherry pickers are also being researched.

Fruit picking in art

See also

 Cherry picker
 Working Holiday Visa

References 

Fruit production
Harvest
Outdoor recreation
Agricultural occupations (plant)

sv:Fruktodling